Jacques-François Ochard (1800–1870) was a French artist, remembered as the first art teacher of Claude Monet at his high school.

Ochard had been a student of Jacques-Louis David (1748–1825), and lived in Normandy, to where Monet's family had moved in 1845. Ochard's method of instruction was the traditional one of drawing from plaster casts of the human figure.

Notes and references

1800 births
1870 deaths
19th-century French painters
French male painters
Pupils of Jacques-Louis David
18th-century French male artists